Kenneth Vernon Byers, Jr. is a former professional American football player who played offensive lineman for three seasons for the New York Giants and Minnesota Vikings.

References

1940 births
American football offensive linemen
New York Giants players
Minnesota Vikings players
Cincinnati Bearcats football players
Living people
People from Logan, Ohio
Players of American football from Ohio